Tymoshivka is a selo located in the Cherkasy Raion of the Cherkasy Oblast, in Ukraine. It is located 6 km south of Kamianka. As of 2009, the village has a population of 811. The selo belongs to Kamianka rural hromada, with the administration in the town of Kamianka.

Until 18 July 2020, Tymoshivka belonged to Kamianka Raion. The raion was abolished in July 2020 as part of the administrative reform of Ukraine, which reduced the number of raions of Cherkasy Oblast to four. The area of Kamianka Raion was merged into Cherkasy Raion.

People 
Karol Szymanowski was born in the village.

References

Villages in Cherkasy Raion